Blue Lou is an album led by drummer Louis Hayes which was recorded in 1993 and released on the Danish SteepleChase label.

Track listing 
 "Blue Lou" (Javon Jackson) – 6:29
 "Quiet Fire" (George Cables) – 10:15
 "Honey Dip" (Milton Sealy) – 7:12
 "Lament for Love" (Ronnie Mathews) – 6:52
 "The Walk" (Eddie Allen) – 9:56
 "Sweet and Lovely" (Gus Arnheim, Jules LeMare, Harry Tobias) – 9:36
 "New Endings" (Philip Harper) – 7:55
 "Spur of the Moment" (Allen) – 7:15

Personnel 
Louis Hayes – drums
Eddie Allen – trumpet
Gerald Hayes – alto saxophone
Javon Jackson – tenor saxophone
Ronnie Mathews – piano
Clint Houston – bass

References 

Louis Hayes albums
1993 albums
SteepleChase Records albums